South Heighton  is a village and civil parish in the Lewes District of East Sussex, England. The village is seven miles (12 km) south of Lewes. In the 1890s  the village's population grew from less than 100 to over 500 after a cement manufacturing plant opened nearby. The village is now associated with the urbanised area of Newhaven.

There is no place called North Heighton although part of the South Downs above the village is called Heighton Hill, from which one can get to Norton, which lies north-east of South Heighton, and north of Bishopstone.

It is a regular thoroughfare and point of rest for ramblers, and features a series of ponds, known locally as 'The Three Lakes', which were until the early 1990s open to the public. It remains a popular destination for local visitors, with its public house, The Hampden Arms, and until recently, its corner-shop and post office, which has now closed and been converted into a residential dwelling. South Heighton is one of many villages in the area which maintains a bonfire society, celebration and parade.

South Heighton is famous for its secret tunnels, built and used for defence during the Second World War, which lie underneath most of the village, with the main entrance at Denton House. In 1998, when work finished on the conversion of Denton House into flats and of the surrounding area into houses, the road was called Forward Close, after the ship associated with Newhaven and the secret tunnels, .

Notable residents, past and present, include
Ralph Reader, originator of the Scouting Gang Show and Ursula Mommens, the great-granddaughter of Charles Darwin and the great-great-granddaughter of the potter Josiah Wedgwood.

Governance
On a local level, South Heighton is governed by the South Heighton Parish Council. Council meetings are held every six weeks in the South Heighton village hall. Their responsibilities include footpaths, street lighting, playgrounds and minor planning applications. The parish council has seven seats available although only four were filled in the uncontested May 2007 election.

The next level of government is the district council. The parish of South Heighton lies within the Ouse Valley and Ringmer ward of Lewes District Council which returns three seats to the council. The election on 4 May 2007 elected two Liberal Democrats and one local Conservative.

East Sussex County Council is the next tier of government, for which South Heighton is within the Ouse Valley East division, with responsibility for Education, Libraries, Social Services, Civil Registration, Trading Standards and Transport. Elections for the County Council are held every four years. The Liberal Democrat Pat Ost was elected in the 2005 election and again in a 2009. In 2013, UKIP candidate Peter Charlton was elected, who was displaced by local Liberal Democrat candidate, Darren Grover, in 2017.

The UK Parliament constituency for South Heighton is Lewes. The Liberal Democrat Norman Baker was the Member of Parliament (MP) for Lewes in East Sussex from his election in 1997 to his defeat in 2015. He was replaced with Maria Caulfield, a Conservative Party politician.

Prior to Brexit in 2020, the village was part of the South East England constituency in the European Parliament.

References

External links

Civil parishes in East Sussex
Villages in East Sussex
Emergency management in the United Kingdom
Tunnels in England